The William R. Wolf House is a historic house in Waseca, Minnesota, United States.  It was built around 1895 and served as the family residence of a prominent local merchant and civic leader.  It was listed on the National Register of Historic Places in 1982 for its local significance in the theme of architecture and commerce.  It was nominated for being Waseca's leading example of the larger residences erected by its prosperous merchant class and of Queen Anne architecture.

The house currently operates as the Pine Gardens Bed and Breakfast.

See also
 National Register of Historic Places listings in Waseca County, Minnesota

References

1895 establishments in Minnesota
Bed and breakfasts in Minnesota
Buildings and structures in Waseca County, Minnesota
Houses completed in 1895
Houses on the National Register of Historic Places in Minnesota
National Register of Historic Places in Waseca County, Minnesota
Queen Anne architecture in Minnesota